Joint Base Langley–Eustis   is a United States military facility located adjacent to Hampton and Newport News, Virginia. The base is an amalgamation of the United States Air Force's Langley Air Force Base and the United States Army's Fort Eustis which were merged on 1 October 2010. The base was established in accordance with congressional legislation implementing the recommendations of the 2005 Base Realignment and Closure Commission.  The legislation ordered the consolidation of the two facilities which were nearby, but separate military installations, into a single Joint Base, one of 12 formed in the United States as a result of the law.
 
Unlike other joint bases that share common perimeters, the two components are geographically separated by 17 miles. In January 2010, the Air Force reactivated the 633rd Air Base Wing to assume host unit and installation support functions at each location. The installation assumed its full operational capability (FOC) in October 2010.   The 633rd ABW commander is Col. Sean K. Tyler, with Chief Master Sgt. Kennon D. Arnold as its command chief master sergeant. The 633rd ABW is responsible to Air Combat Command.

Langley Air Force Base

Langley Air Force Base is the first half of Joint Base Langley–Eustis and is home to JBLE's Air Force units. With the 633rd Air Base Wing as its host unit, this portion of the base is home to three Fighter Squadrons and one Fighter Training Squadron, as well as numerous intelligence units and other non-flying units.

Langley also hosts the Headquarters of Air Combat Command (ACC).

Langley is also home to the F-22 Raptor Demo Team. This team, who travels all over the world performing different maneuvers used in air combat, is used to help recruit for the United States Air Force. Performing in airshows and other special events all around the world, the squadron is the only demonstration team in the world to use the F-22 Raptor.

Fort Eustis

Fort Eustis, a historic Army installation and the second half of Joint Base Langley–Eustis, is an area to train service members in transportation, aviation maintenance, logistics and deployment doctrine with its diverse landscape and easy access to the James River.
 
The installation is the training ground for the majority of the transportation MOSs (with the exception of the 88M truck driver specialty located at Fort Leonard Wood, Mo.) and all of the helicopter maintenance technicians.  It is the home of the Transportation Regiment, and received the transfer of some activities that were conducted at Fort Monroe, which was decommissioned on September 15, 2011 under BRAC.

Based units 
Notable units based at Joint Base Langley-Eustis.

Units marked GSU are Geographically Separate Units, which although based at Joint Base Langley-Eustis, are subordinate to a parent unit based at another location.

United States Air Force 
Air Combat Command (ACC)
 Headquarters Air Combat Command
 ACC Communications Support Squadron
 Fifteenth Air Force
 633rd Air Base Wing (Host Unit)
 633rd Air Base Wing Staff Agencies
 633rd Comptroller Squadron
 633rd Medical Group
 633rd Operational Medical Readiness Squadron
 633rd Dental Squadron
 633rd Healthcare Operations Squadron
 633rd Medical Support Squadron
 633rd Surgical Operations Squadron
 633rd Mission Support Group
 633rd Civil Engineer Squadron
 633rd Communications Squadron
 633rd Contracting Squadron
 633rd Logistics Readiness Squadron
 633rd Force Support Squadron
 633rd Security Forces Squadron
 733rd Mission Support Group
 733rd Civil Engineer Squadron
 733rd Force Support Squadron
 733rd Security Forces Squadron
 733rd Logistics Readiness Squadron
 1st Fighter Wing
 1st Operations Group
 27th Fighter Squadron – F-22 Raptor
 94th Fighter Squadron – F-22 Raptor
 71st Fighter Training Squadron – T-38 Talon
 F-22 Raptor Demo Team - F-22 Raptor
 1st Operations Support Squadron
 1st Maintenance Group
 27th Fighter Generation Squadron
 94th Fighter Generation Squadron
 1st Munitions Squadron
 1st Maintenance Squadron
 1st Equipment Maintenance Squadron
 1st Component Maintenance Squadron

 Sixteenth Air Force
 363rd Intelligence, Surveillance and Reconnaissance Wing
 363rd Intelligence, Surveillance, and Reconnaissance Group
 17th Intelligence Squadron
 36th Intelligence Squadron
 20th Intelligence Squadron, Detachment 1
 363rd Intelligence Support Squadron
 480th Intelligence, Surveillance and Reconnaissance Wing
 27th Intelligence Squadron
 497th Intelligence, Surveillance and Reconnaissance Group
 10th Intelligence Squadron
 30th Intelligence Squadron
 45th Intelligence Squadron
 497th Operations Support Squadron
 688th Cyberspace Wing
 690th Cyberspace Operations Group
 83rd Network Operations Squadron (GSU)

 United States Air Force Warfare Center
 505th Command and Control Wing
 505th Test and Training Group
 605th Test and Evaluation Squadron, Operating Location Alpha (GSU)

Air Education and Training Command (AETC)
 Second Air Force
 82nd Training Wing
 82nd Training Group
 362nd Training Squadron, Detachment 1 (GSU)

Air Force Materiel Command (AFMC)
Air Force Sustainment Center
 635th Supply Chain Operations Wing
 735th Supply Chain Operations Group (GSU)
 438th Supply Chain Operations Squadron
 439th Supply Chain Operations Squadron
 440th Supply Chain Operations Squadron
 441st Vehicle Support Chain Operations Squadron

United States Air Force Band
 The United States Air Force Heritage of America Band

Air Force Reserve Command (AFRC)
 Fourth Air Force
 940th Air Refueling Wing
 940th Operations Group
 710th Combat Operations Squadron (GSU)
Tenth Air Force
 655th Intelligence, Surveillance and Reconnaissance Wing
 755th Intelligence, Surveillance and Reconnaissance Group (GSU)
 42nd Intelligence Squadron
 63rd Intelligence Squadron
 718th Intelligence Squadron
 960th Cyberspace Wing
 860th Cyberspace Operations Group
 51st Network Operations Squadron (GSU)

Air National Guard (ANG)
 Virginia Air National Guard
 192nd Wing
 192nd Operations Group
 149th Fighter Squadron - F-22 Raptor
 192nd Intelligence Squadron
 185th Cyberspace Operations Squadron
 192nd Operations Support Squadron
 192nd Maintenance Group
 192nd Aircraft Maintenance Squadron
 192nd Maintenance Squadron
 192nd Maintenance Operations Flight
 192nd Mission Support Group
 192nd Support Squadron
 192nd Security Forces Squadron
 192nd Medical Group

Civil Air Patrol (CAP)
 Mid-Atlantic Region
 Virginia Wing
 Group 2
 Langley Composite Squadron (MAR-VA-025) (GSU)

United States Army 
United States Army Forces Command (FORSCOM)
 XVIII Airborne Corps
 7th Transportation Brigade (Expeditionary) (GSU)
 10th Transportation Battalion
 11th Transportation Battalion
 53rd Movement Control Battalion

Military Surface Deployment and Distribution Command (SDDC)
 597th Transportation Brigade
 832nd Transportation Battalion

United States Army Training and Doctrine Command (TRADOC)
 Headquarters United States Army Training and Doctrine Command
 United States Army Aviation Center of Excellence
 128th Aviation Brigade (GSU)
 210th Aviation Regiment
 222nd Aviation Regiment

United States Coast Guard 
 Port Security Unit 305

Department of Defense 
Air Land Sea Application Center (ALSA)

United States Northern Command (USNORTHCOM)

 Joint Task Force – Civil Support (JTF-CS)

National Aeronautics and Space Administration 
'''Langley Research Center

References

External links 

 

 
 

Joint bases of the U.S. Department of Defense
Military installations in Virginia
Buildings and structures in Newport News, Virginia
Populated places on the James River (Virginia)
2010 establishments in Virginia
Airports in Virginia
Superfund sites in Virginia
Military Superfund sites